Battle of Aksu may refer to:

 Battle of Aksu (717), a battle of the Muslim conquest of Transoxiana
 Battle of Aksu (1933), a minor battle of the Kumul Rebellion